= Paprika coalition =

SPD–Green–Pirate Party coalition in Germany

The parties involved

SPD

Alliance 90/The Greens

Pirate Party Germany

The Paprika Coalition (German: Paprika-Koalition) is a coalition in Germany between the Social Democratic Party of Germany (SPD), Alliance 90/The Greens, and the Pirate Party Germany. The name comes from the colors of bell peppers (paprika): red, green, and orange. It has only been present at the municipal level. It existed in Bielefeld from 2014 to 2021 and briefly in Cologne in 2015.
